This is a list of black and white films that were subsequently colorized.

A

B

C

D

E

F

G

H

I

J

K

L

M

N

O

P

R

S

T

U

V

W

Y

Z

Notes

References 

 
black-and-white films that have been colorized
 List of black-and-white films that have been colorized